Catherine Elizabeth West (born 14 September 1966) is a Labour Party politician in the United Kingdom. She was first elected as the Member of Parliament (MP) for Hornsey and Wood Green in May 2015.

Early life and education
West was born on 14 September 1966 in Mansfield, Australia, one of four children to Janet (née Conti) and Roderick West AM. Her parents were both teachers and her father was Headmaster of Trinity Grammar School in Sydney for 21 years. She is the great-great niece of actress Italia Conti. She grew up in Sydney and was privately educated at Meriden and Ravenswood. West studied modern languages and social work at the University of Sydney. While studying there, she met her future husband Colin Sutherland. They lived together in Darwin, Northern Territory where she worked as a social worker in a refuge for survivors of childhood sexual abuse. West and Sutherland moved to the United Kingdom (UK) in 1998 when he gained a job at the London School of Hygiene & Tropical Medicine. She then gained a master's degree in Chinese Studies from the School of Oriental and African Studies, University of London.

Political career
West joined the Labour Party in 1998 and became a caseworker for MP David Lammy two years later.
From 2 May 2002 to 22 May 2014, West was a member of the Islington London Borough Council representing the Tollington Ward. She was the leader of the council's Labour Party group from 2004 to 10 October 2013 and Council Leader from 6 May 2010 to 10 October 2013. She resigned as councillor in order to contest the 2015 general election.

She was elected Member of Parliament (MP) for Hornsey and Wood Green in the 2015 general election.

Following the election of Jeremy Corbyn as Leader of the Labour Party, whose campaign she supported, West was promoted to the Official Opposition Frontbench as a Shadow Foreign Office Minister.

During the 2016 EU membership referendum Campaign, West was involved with Britain Stronger In Europe, campaigning for the UK to remain within the European Union, arguing that "Britain would be stronger, more prosperous, more secure and more peaceful" if they were to remain within the EU. West's constituency of Hornsey and Wood Green secured the highest remain vote in the UK with 81.5% voting to remain. Following the EU referendum, West confirmed she would vote against invoking Article 50 should a vote come before parliament. Between September 2016 and June 2017, she was an officer of the All-Party Parliamentary Group on UK-EU Relations.

In January 2017, West voted against triggering Article 50 of the Lisbon Treaty, the process by which EU Member States may use to withdraw from the European Union, along with 46 other Labour Party Members of parliament.

West was sacked from the Labour frontbench in June 2017 after she voted in favour of an amendment to the Queen's Speech which called on the UK to remain in the European Single Market, in defiance of the Labour whip.

West returned to the Labour frontbench in 2020 as shadow Sport Minister, prior to her promotion to the shadow Foreign Office team under new Labour Leader Sir Keir Stamer. West is currently Labour's shadow Minister for Asia & the Pacific.

Personal life
West is a Quaker. She is one of three Quakers elected during the 2015 general election, the others being Ruth Cadbury in the Labour Party and Tania Mathias in the Conservative Party. She is married to Colin Sutherland, co-director of the London School of Hygiene & Tropical Medicine's Malaria Centre. They met while studying at the University of Sydney. They have a daughter and a son.

She is a dual British and Australian national.

References

External links 

 
 

1966 births
Living people
Australian expatriates in England
Alumni of SOAS University of London
British people of Australian descent
Councillors in the London Borough of Islington
English Quakers
Female members of the Parliament of the United Kingdom for English constituencies
Labour Party (UK) councillors
Labour Party (UK) MPs for English constituencies
University of Sydney alumni
Wood Green
21st-century British women politicians
UK MPs 2015–2017
UK MPs 2017–2019
UK MPs 2019–present
Leaders of local authorities of England
Politicians from Sydney
21st-century English women
21st-century English people
Women councillors in England